Roberto Occhiuto (born 13 May 1969), is an Italian politician, President of Calabria since 29 October 2021.

Biography

Comunal and regional councilor
Brother of Mario Occhiuto, mayor of Cosenza from 2011 to 2021, Occhiuto was elected for the first time as communal councilor in his hometown Cosenza in 1993, holding his seat until 2000. Occhiuto was later elected as regional councilor of Calabria in the 2000 and the 2005 regional elections.

Member of the Chamber of Deputies
Occhiuto was elected to the Chamber of Deputies with the Union of the Centre at the 2008 Italian general election. Failing re-election in 2013, he took over Lorenzo Cesa's seat the following year, after the latter was elected to the European Parliament.

After he joined Silvio Berlusconi's Forza Italia, Occhiuto was re-elected deputy at the 2018 election and became Forza Italia group leader at the Chamber of Deputies after Mariastella Gelmini appointment as Minister of Regional Affairs in the Draghi Cabinet.

2009 provincial election
Occhiuto ran in 2009 as the Union of the Centre candidate for the office of President of the Province of Cosenza but failed the election by ranking third.

2021 regional election
After the sudden death of Jole Santelli and the calling for new regional elections, Occhiuto was appointed as the centre-right candidate for the office of President of Calabria.

Personal life
On 22 September 2022, he became father of Tommaso, his third son, born from politician . Occhiuto already had two children from a previous marriage.

References

External links
Files about his parliamentary activities (in Italian): XVI, XVII, XVIII legislature.

1969 births
Living people
Presidents of Calabria
People from Cosenza
Politicians of Calabria
Christian Democracy (Italy) politicians
Italian People's Party (1994) politicians
United Christian Democrats politicians
Union of the Centre (2002) politicians
Forza Italia (2013) politicians
20th-century Italian politicians
21st-century Italian politicians
Deputies of Legislature XVI of Italy
Deputies of Legislature XVII of Italy
Deputies of Legislature XVIII of Italy